The Marriage Bond is a 1932 British drama film directed by Maurice Elvey and starring Mary Newcomb, Guy Newall and Stewart Rome. It was made by Twickenham Film Studios.

Plot summary
A drunken man is left by his wife but she later comes back to him when she realises how desperate he is.

Cast
 Mary Newcomb as Jacqueline Heron 
 Guy Newall as Toby Heron 
 Stewart Rome as Sir Paul Swaythling 
 Ann Casson as Binnie Heron 
 Florence Desmond as Elsie 
 Denys Blakelock as Alfred Dreisler 
 Lewis Shaw as Frere Heron 
 Humberston Wright as Jenkins 
 Amy Veness as Mrs Crust

References

Bibliography
 Low, Rachael. Filmmaking in 1930s Britain. George Allen & Unwin, 1985.
 Wood, Linda. British Films, 1927-1939. British Film Institute, 1986.

External links

1932 films
1932 drama films
1930s English-language films
Films directed by Maurice Elvey
British drama films
Films shot at Twickenham Film Studios
British black-and-white films
1930s British films